Zeta is a banking tech company by founders Bhavin Turakhia and Ramki Gaddipati in 2015. The company provides credit and debit processing, BNPL, core banking and "mobile experiences". Zeta provides its products to banks and fintechs globally.

History 
The company was founded in April 2015 by Bhavin Turakhia and Ramki Gaddipati. Its initial offerings were for employee tax benefits, automated cafeterias, employee gifting and digital payments. In 2016, Bhavin Turakhia invested around $19 million into Zeta. Initially, Zeta payments was only supported by the MasterCard network but later the company also tied-up with the National Payments Corporation of India's RuPay.
In June 2017, the company invested 5-10 crore to buy a minority stake in an HR company called ZingHR. 
Zeta has partnerships with IDFC Bank, Sodexo, Excelity Global, Kotak Mahindra Bank and RBL Bank. Zeta launched the first employee benefits survey in India along with Nielsen Holdings in April 2018. It also bought a minority stake in PeopleStrong in January 2018. In 2019, Zeta received an investment from Sodexo BRS at a valuation of $300 million. In 2020, Zeta launched its technology platform-as-a-service in The Philippines and Vietnam with Sodexo being its first client in these countries. In 2021, Zeta secured Series C investment of $250 million  from SoftBank Vision Fund 2 valueing Zeta at $1.45 billion. This is one of the largest single investments in a banking tech startup globally.

Awards and recognition 
 Selected as one of the Emerge 50 startups by NASSCOM.
 FinTech Rising Stars at India FinTech Awards 2017 by India FinTech Forum.
 BusinessWorld Techtors Award 2018.
Finovate West Digital Best of Show Award 2020.
Business Today-KPMG Best Fintech in Value Added Services Award 2020.

Merger 
Zeta's employee benefits business merged with Sodexo BRS India in 2019.

See also 

 Neobank
Sodexo
 Paytm
 FreeCharge

References

2015 establishments in Karnataka
Food and drink companies established in 2015
Catering and food service companies of India
IOS software
Android (operating system) software
Online financial services companies of India
Financial services companies established in 2015
Companies based in Bangalore
Internet properties established in 2015
Privately held companies of India
Indian brands